Banff is a town within Banff National Park in Alberta, Canada.

The Town of Banff was the first municipality to incorporate within a Canadian national park. The town is a member of the Calgary Regional Partnership.

Banff is a resort town and one of Canada's most popular tourist destinations. Known for its mountainous surroundings and hot springs, it is a destination for outdoor sports and features extensive hiking, biking, scrambling and skiing destinations within the area. Sunshine Village, Ski Norquay and Lake Louise Ski Resort are the three nearby ski resorts located within the national park.

Toponymy
The area was named Banff in 1884 by George Stephen, president of the Canadian Pacific Railway, recalling his birthplace near Banff, Scotland. The Canadian Pacific built a series of grand hotels along the rail line and advertised the Banff Springs Hotel as an international tourist resort.

History 

Banff was first settled in the 1880s after the transcontinental railway was built through the Bow Valley. In 1883, three Canadian Pacific Railway workers stumbled upon a series of natural hot springs on the side of Sulphur Mountain. In 1885, Canada established a federal reserve of  around the Cave and Basin hot springs and began promoting the area as an international resort and spa as a way to support the new railway. This was the beginning of Canada's National Park system.

The Banff townsite was developed near the railway station as a service centre for tourists visiting the park. Services, such as St George-in-the-Pines church, were constructed through the late 19th century. It was administered by the Government of Canada's national parks system until 1990 when the Town of Banff became the only incorporated municipality within a Canadian national park.

An internment camp was set up at Banff and Castle Mountain in Dominion Park from July 1915 to July 1917 mostly imprisoning Ukrainian immigrants. The prisoners of the internment camp were used as slave labour to build the infrastructure of the national park.

In 1985, the United Nations declared Banff National Park, as one of the Canadian Rocky Mountain Parks, a World Heritage Site. Banff remains one of the most popular tourist destinations in Canada.

One of the most notable figures of Banff was Norman Luxton, who was known as "Mr. Banff". He published the Crag and Canyon newspaper, built the King Edward Hotel and the Lux Theatre, and founded the Sign of the Goat Curio Shop, which led to the development of the Luxton Museum of Plains Indians, now the Buffalo Nations Museum. He and his family helped organize the Banff Indian Days and the Banff Winter Carnival.

In 1976, the International Astronomical Union's Working Group for Planetary System Nomenclature (IAU/WGPSN) officially adopted the name Banff for a crater on Mars, after the town in Alberta. The crater is at latitude 17.7° north and longitude 30.8° west.

In 1991, Banff hosted the 1991 Winter Deaflympics, the first Deaflympics hosted in Canada, and the only Deaflympics held in Canada since then.

In response to the COVID-19 pandemic, the town chose to temporarily close portions of its main street to vehicle traffic to create a Downtown Pedestrian Zone. The Banff Town Council said the pedestrian zone will stay in effect until at least 2023.

Geography 
It is surrounded by mountains, notably Mount Rundle, Sulphur Mountain, Mount Norquay, and Cascade Mountain. The town is above Bow Falls near the confluence of the Bow River and Spray River. Soils are calcareous and usually imperfectly to poorly drained in their natural state with textures from very fine sandy loam to silty clay loam.

Climate 
Banff experiences a subarctic climate (Köppen climate classification Dfc) that borders on a humid continental climate (Köppen Dfb).
Snow has been recorded in all months of the year. The annual snowfall averages .

Demographics 

In the Canada 2016 Census conducted by Statistics Canada, the Town of Banff recorded a population of 7,851 living in 2,543 of its 2,729 total private dwellings, a  change from its 2011 population of 7,584.

Parks Canada enforces requirements that individuals must meet to reside in the town, in order "to ensure that a broad supply of housing types are available for those who work and raise families in the community".

Attractions 

There are several mountains located immediately adjacent to the townsite, including Mount Rundle; Cascade Mountain; and Mount Norquay. Mount Norquay has a ski slope as well as mountain biking trails on the Stoney Squaw portion, and Via Ferrata (an assisted climbing experience). A tourist attraction, the Banff Gondola, is available to ascend Sulphur Mountain where a boardwalk (Banff Skywalk) beginning from the upper terminal connects to Sanson Peak. Sulphur Mountain is also the location of the Banff Upper Hot Springs.

Lake Minnewanka located six minutes north of the townsite is a day-use area with a variety of activities. Mountain biking, hiking, and fishing are allowed in this part of the park. A Lake Cruise, motor boat rentals, and a small food concession are available at the marina.

Tunnel Mountain (formerly known as Sleeping Buffalo Mountain) is situated within the townsite and has a summit that can be scaled in less than half an hour. It was named Tunnel Mountain because surveyors initially wanted to make a tunnel for the Canadian Pacific Railway right through the mountain, instead of following the Bow River Valley. Located on the side of Tunnel Mountain is the Banff Centre for Arts and Creativity, which hosts events, including outdoor concerts, dance, opera, and theatre.

Banff is home to the Banff World Television Festival, Banff Mountain Film Festival, Rocky Mountain Music Festival, and Bike Fest. The town is also the starting point of the  Great Divide Mountain Bike Route, which terminates at Antelope Wells, New Mexico in the United States.

Sports 
Banff and nearby Canmore played host to the 2014 Alberta Winter Games.

Banff also hosted the 1991 Winter Deaflympics.

For several years there has been an annual long-distance relay run between Banff and Jasper, Alberta (formerly known as the Jasper to Banff Relay).

Banff has a long history of hosting Team Canada hockey training camps, including Canada's 2012 World Junior Ice Hockey Championships team when the event was held in Alberta and the 1984 Canada Cup squad which practiced there, before the start of the tournament.

Infrastructure

Transportation 

In June 2008, the Banff council launched a local bus system called Roam, with three routes connecting the town, Tunnel Mountain, the Banff Springs Hotel, and the Banff Gondola. The service is operated using four hybrid Nova buses, each decorated with scenes from the National Park. There are three separate routes:
• Route 1: which goes to Sulphur Mountain
• Route 2: which goes to Tunnel Mountain
• Route 3: which goes from Banff to nearby Canmore.
Many bus stops along the routes have screens that tell exactly how many minutes before the next two buses arrive. In December 2012, the bus system was expanded to include the Route 3 hourly service between Banff and Canmore.

Via Rail's long-distance trains no longer serve Banff, but the Banff railway station remains in use by the Rocky Mountaineer and Royal Canadian Pacific tour trains.

The nearest airport to Banff with major service is the Calgary International Airport in Calgary.

Health care 
Acute health care is provided at the Banff – Mineral Springs Hospital.

Media

Notable people 
 Derek Beaulieu, poet, publisher, and anthologist
 Sonya Lea, award-winning author and filmmaker
 Karen Percy, double-bronze medal skier at the 1988 Winter Olympics
 J. Jill Robinson, award-winning author of fiction and creative nonfiction
 Kevin Smyth, former NHL player
 Ryan Smyth, former NHL player
 Karen Sorensen, former mayor and Canadian senator
 Barrie Stafford, former Edmonton Oilers and Team Canada trainer

See also 
 Banff Centre
 Banff International Research Station (BIRS)
List of cities in Canada by elevation

References

External links 

 
1990 establishments in Alberta
Towns in Alberta
Populated places established in 1990